Honoré Hippolyte Achille Gervais (August 13, 1864 – August 8, 1915) was a Canadian lawyer, professor, politician.

Born in Richelieu, Rouville County, Canada East, the son of Charles Gervais and Adele Monty, Gervais was educated at the "Petit Seminaire" of Sainte-Marie-de-Monnoir and Université Laval where he received a Master of Laws (LL.M.) in 1887 and a Doctor of Laws (LL.D) in 1889. He was admitted to the Bar of the Province of Quebec on 13 January 1887 and created a Queen's Counsel in 1897.

In 1896, he joined Université Laval as a Professor of International Law and Civil Procedure. He practised law in partnership with Horace Archambault, former President of the Quebec Legislative Council and ex- Attorney-General, Henri-Benjamin Rainville, former Speaker of the Quebec Legislative Assembly, and Paul Rainville in the firm Rainville, Archambault, Gervais & Rainville.

He was first elected to the House of Commons of Canada for the Montreal electoral district of St. James in a 1904 by-election called after the 1902 by-election was declared void. A Liberal, he was re-elected in 1904 and 1908.

References
 
 The Canadian Parliament; biographical sketches and photo-engravures of the senators and members of the House of Commons of Canada. Being the tenth Parliament, elected November 3, 1904

1864 births
1915 deaths
Liberal Party of Canada MPs
Members of the House of Commons of Canada from Quebec
Lawyers in Quebec
Université Laval alumni
Canadian King's Counsel